Formacja Nieżywych Schabuff – Polish pop band formed in 1985 in Częstochowa.

Discography

Studio albums

Compilation albums

References

External links

Polish pop music groups
Culture in Częstochowa